Searsid is a term used to refer to fish of the family Platytroctidae that resemble Searsia koefoedi. Fish referred to as searsids include:

bigeye searsid (Holtbyrnia macrops)
bighead searsid (Holtbyrnia anomala)
Koefoed's searsid (Searsia koefoedi)
legless searsid (Platytroctes apus)
Maul's searsid (Maulisia mauli)
multipore searsid (Normichthys operosus)
palebelly searsid (Barbantus curvifrons)
palegold searsid (Maulisia argipalla)
Schnakenbeck's searsid (Sagamichthys schnakenbecki)
smallscale searsid (Maulisia microlepis)